Chisako Kakehi (born 28 November 1946) is a Japanese serial killer who was sentenced to death for the murders of three men, including her husband, and for the attempted murder of a fourth. She is also suspected of being responsible for at least seven other deaths.

Kakehi was arrested in 2014, after an autopsy on her fourth husband, Isao Kakehi, revealed traces of cyanide poisoning.

She initially pleaded not guilty, but during her 2017 trial, confessed, stating on the witness stand that she had no intention of hiding the guilt and wanted to kill her husband out of deep hatred; two days later, she retracted this confession, claiming to not remember having said it. Her lawyers subsequently argued that she suffered from dementia and could not be convicted due to diminished responsibility.

In June 2021, the Supreme Court of Japan rejected her final appeal. One of the judges explained the decision based on Chisako's "ruthless crime(s) based on a planned and strong murderous intention."

See also
List of serial killers by country

References

Living people
1947 births
Mariticides
Poisoners
Violence against men in Asia
Japanese female serial killers
Japanese people convicted of murder
Japanese prisoners sentenced to death
People convicted of murder by Japan
Prisoners sentenced to death by Japan
Women sentenced to death